Butlers GmbH & Co KG is a German lifestyle retail chain that sells home accessories, decoration, furniture and gifts in more than 160 stores throughout Europe. The Cologne-based company also uses the tag line “made for your home” and the presentation of decoration ideas by means of themed tables to run an online shop for Austria, Great Britain, Germany, Switzerland and Spain.

History 
Butlers originates from the family run company "Wilhelm Josten Söhne", founded in 1829 in Neuss, Germany, which included the department store "Josten" – known for kitchenware and household appliances. In 1999 the brothers Wilhelm and Paul Josten together with Frank Holzapfel opened the first Butlers store in Cologne.

In the year 2005 Butlers expanded abroad with its sub companies "Butlers Trading Ltd." and "Butlers Handel GmbH". The first branches outside of Germany were established in London, Zurich and Vienna. Whilst the stores in Germany, Austria, Switzerland, Spain and Great Britain are managed by Butlers own company, franchise partners run shops in Hungary, Ukraine, Greece, Croatia, Malta, Luxembourg and the Czech Republic.

In cooperation with the German start-up Stickvogel, Butlers introduced in 2011 the service "Made by you" to individualize products via an online-configurator by embroidering and engraving or to print pictures on canvas.

In 2004 Butlers won a German Retail Association award. The company was elected twice (2005 and 2012) finalist in the contest Ernst & Young Entrepreneur of the Year Award. Furthermore, Butlers secured a victory at the German eCommerce Awards 2012 ("Deutscher Online-Handels-Award") and the NEOCOM Congress 2013 ("Versender des Jahres").

Assortment 
The assortment contains kitchenware, household appliances, furniture, table decorations, home accessories and textiles.

References

External links 
 Official website

Retail companies of Germany
Companies based in North Rhine-Westphalia
Multinational companies headquartered in Germany
Retail companies established in 1999
1999 establishments in Germany